Janine Hosking is an Australian documentary film maker. She won a Walkley Award in 1997 for a Seven Network television report titled Tjandamurra, the story of Tjandamurra O'Shane.

Hosking has made several other well received documentaries including:

My Khmer Heart. Ikandy Films (2001) - story of an Australian nurse and her work in an orphanage outside Phnom Penh.
Mademoiselle and the Doctor.  Ikandy Films (2004) - story of the suicide of 80-year-old French-Australian woman Lisette Nigot and euthanasia advocate Dr Philip Nitschke. A scene from the film showing the use of a suicide bag was controversially edited from the ABC screening by Compass presenter Geraldine Doogue and was the subject of a separate report on Media Watch.
With This Ring (2005) - aired on ABC Television's Australian Story
Ganja Queen (2007) - about the arrest, trial, and imprisonment of Schapelle Corby
I'm Not Dead Yet (2011) - about Australian country music legend Chad Morgan

References

Australian film producers
Australian documentary filmmakers
Australian film directors
Australian women film directors
Living people
Women documentary filmmakers
Year of birth missing (living people)